Prithvipur is a village of Tanda, Ambedkar Nagar, Uttar Pradesh, India. It is also a Tehsil and forms part of Faizabad division. Akbarpur is the district headquarters and is  distant. The postal code is 224190.

Caste
Village  has separation population of  Schedule Caste (SC) constitutes 32.79% of total population in village. The village currently doesn’t have any Schedule Tribe (ST) peoples.

Demographics
As of 2011 India census Prithvipur had a population of 2,074. Males constitute 53% of the population and females 47%.There's 352 house in Prithvipur.

Transportation
There is no railway station near  in less than 35 km. However, Basti Railway Station is major railway station 50 km  from Prithvipur and, there is railway station but from here 30 km Akbarpur Junction Railway Station.

Weather
Prithvipur of climate of summer (March to July) temperatures can range from 30 to 40 degrees Celsius. Winter climate (November to January) temperatures can range from 10 to 20 degrees Celsius.

See also

List of villages in India

References

Villages in Ambedkar Nagar district